Edvard Johannes Brost Forssell (25 September 1946 – 4 January 2018) was a Swedish actor. He became recognized for his roles in the television programs Stjärnhuset and Rederiet; in Rederiet he appeared in 318 episodes. In 2013, he won a Guldbagge award for his role in the film Avalon. He also had several roles in theater.

Biography

Early life
Born in Stockholm on 25 September 1946, Brost was the son of author and journalist , and film and theater actor Gudrun Brost. The musician and actor —father of television and radio host Gry Forssell—was his half brother.

As a child, he did not want to be an actor like his mother, whom he sometimes accompanied to work. He later chose to start acting and applied to the Royal Dramatic Theatre drama school, but failed in the first round of auditions. He took private acting lessons with director  and then he successfully applied to the Teaterhögskolan in Malmö. He graduated in 1970. After graduation he was employed by the Stockholm City Theatre, where he stayed for two years. After that he acted at Åbo Svenska Theater in Finland and then at Riksteatern, Unga Teatern and Malmö City Theatre. He also took part in the Tältprojektet in 1977.

Career

In 1981, he had the leading role in the SVT children's television program Christmas calendar titled Stjärnhuset, which won him national recognition. A year later Brost became a panelist on the ratings success Gäster med gester, which began airing on SVT; he also appeared in several pantomimes.

Brost became best known for his role as Joker the bartender in the television series Rederiet; he appeared in all 318 episodes of the series, which ran  between 1992 and 2002. He also had roles in several films, including Black Jack, Änglagård, Jönssonligan dyker upp igen and The Visitors.

He was an honorary citizen of Laholm and produced several summer revue shows there. He also appeared in several plays directed by Eva Rydberg at Fredriksdalsteatern in Helsingborg.

In 2013, Brost won a Guldbagge award for his leading role in the 2011 film Avalon. He also played Pekka in the series Jordskott and appeared in the show Lilyhammer.

In 2016, Brost took part in the SVT show Stjärnorna på slottet, in which he spoke about his life and career. He also appeared as a celebrity dancer in Let's Dance 2017 on TV4. His last role, in December 2017, was that of Sievert Lindberg, a wealthy man interested in a friend of Dagmar Friman, in the SVT series Fröken Frimans krig'.

Personal life
Brost became friends with singer Mick Jagger after they met in 1965 when Jagger and the Rolling Stones performed in Malmö and went to a nightclub where Brost was working. When told about Brost's death, Jagger stated that "He was a wonderful guy" and that "We will miss his humour" and his generosity.

Brost had four children. He died from complications of throat cancer on 4 January 2018; he was to appear on a TV4 program, Tillsammans mot cancer'' (Together Against Cancer) on 8 January.

Selected filmography

References

External links

1946 births
2018 deaths
Male actors from Stockholm
Swedish comedians
Swedish male television actors
Best Actor Guldbagge Award winners
Deaths from cancer in Sweden
Swedish people of German descent